The concept of absolute war was a theoretical construct developed by the Prussian military theorist General Carl von Clausewitz in his famous but unfinished philosophical exploration of war, Vom Kriege (in English, On War, 1832). It is discussed only in the first half of Book VIII (there are only a couple of references to it elsewhere) and it does not appear in sections of the text written later.

The notion of an "absolute form of war" is very clearly derived from the new style of warfare introduced by the French Revolution and brought to a high level of performance by Napoleon Bonaparte. Although it is presented as a philosophical concept, and thus probably not capable of perfect attainment in the real world, it was nonetheless modeled very closely on Napoleon's most masterful campaigns and was intended to be pursued or emulated by commanders "when possible." Absolute war was characterized by very high levels of energy and professional competence, and it aims at the destruction of the opposing force and the attainment of a political decision by force of arms. It contrasts to a weaker, less competent—even pointless—form Clausewitz called "war of observation," based on the carefully circumscribed use of force in the century or so prior to the French Revolution. This two-ended framework appears to have been experimental. Clausewitz became quite critical of it by the middle of Book VIII—thereafter the term absolute war dropped out and the weak, befuddled nature of "war of observation" was transformed into a perfectly legitimate, respectable form called the "limited aim." In Book I, drafted later, the term absolute war does not appear; for practical purposes, war in the real world is described using a spectrum bounded by the limited aim of wearing down the enemy's will to carry on the military struggle versus the most ambitious form available in reality, the aim of rendering one's opponent militarily helpless.

Absolute War is often confused with the very different concept of "ideal war" featured in the first chapter of On War. In that discussion, Clausewitz explained that ideal war is a philosophical abstraction—a "logical fantasy"—that is impossible in practice because it is not directed or constrained by political motives or concerns, nor limited by the practical constraints of time, space, and human nature. He called warfare constrained by these moderating real-world influences real war. Absolute War is also routinely confused with "Total War," a term that does  not appear on Vom Kriege.

Ideal war can be seen to be an act of violence without compromise by mirror-image states pursuing objectives of the very highest importance, in which they fight to war's "logical" extremes; it is a war unaffected by political and moral considerations or moderation.  In On War, Clausewitz explains what makes up this "ideal" (in a philosophical sense) war:

The three Reciprocal Actions

The utmost use of force

Clausewitz states that "...it follows that he who uses force unsparingly; without reference to bloodshed involved, must obtain a superiority if his adversary uses less vigour in [the] application [of force]."  Therefore, war in its most logical form would involve each state continually reciprocating each other's use of force (plus some) to maintain a superiority, until both were using violence to its utmost extent.  This is the first reciprocal action, and leads to the first extreme of war. As stated in his text.

The aim is to disarm the enemy

Clausewitz stated that the logical purpose of war is to make the opponent comply with one's will.  However, an opponent will obviously not do that unless it becomes the least oppressive of its available options.  Therefore, in order to make the enemy comply with one's will, a state must place its adversary in a position that is more oppressive to it than compliance.  Furthermore, that position cannot be temporary, or appear to be temporary. This is because it will be more likely that an enemy will simply 'ride out the storm' in the prospect of being in a better position at a later stage. Any change in this position would be a change for the worse, and so in order to best achieve this position a state must disarm its enemy (forcing it into a position from which it cannot resist).

Furthermore, as war involves two (or more) hostile states, this principle applies to both, and so it becomes the second reciprocal action, whereby both try to impose such a position on the other.

An utmost exertion of powers

Here Clausewitz states that if a state wishes to defeat its enemies it must annihilate them.  According to Clausewitz, the use of power involves two factors.  The first is the strength of available means, which may be measured somewhat by numbers (although not entirely). The second factor is the strength of the will which cannot be specifically measured (only estimated) as it is intangible.

Once a state has learned the enemy's strength of resistance it can review its own means and adjust them upwards accordingly in an effort to gain the advantage. As the enemy will also be doing this, it too becomes reciprocal (the third reciprocal action), creating a third push towards an extreme.

Confusion with Total War

The recognition of total war since the start of World War I has arguably created a degree of confusion for many scholars, who may have failed to understand the differences between it and the concept of absolute war, often using the terms interchangeably and blaming Germany's conduct of "total war" on the writings of Prussian military theorist Carl von Clausewitz. In reality, however, Clausewitz neither coined nor used the term "total war," and "absolute (or ideal) war," it is argued, is quite a different concept. Total war is essentially a war in which the home front (that is, a state's political system, society and economy) is mobilised to a massive degree for the continuation and expansion of the war effort—it implies the subordination of politics (internal and external) to the goal of purely military victory (a notion that Clausewitz would have regarded as nonsensical). It is characterised by civilian infrastructure and civilians themselves becoming highly involved in war as part of the military's logistical support system.

Ideal war on the other hand, is a theoretical ideal in which war reaches its logical extremes (as mentioned above), which free it from the moderating effects that are imposed on it by politics and society, not to mention the practical constraints of time and space.  As wars cannot run themselves and require politics and society to exist, Clausewitz held that ideal war was impossible because political and military leaders cannot avoid these influences.

Much of the confusion over "absolute war" is the result of Clausewitz's personal intellectual evolution: the book was unfinished at the time of his untimely death and there are important contradictions between some of his earlier thinking and the most advanced elements, the latter being represented by the last half of Book VIII, Book I (the only part of Clausewitz's unfinished draft that he considered to be in finished form), and the "Note of 1827." He never had the opportunity to bring the discussion of absolute war into accord with these later writings. Thus "absolute war" reflects an earlier conception advocating the more extreme reaches of the forms that Napoleonic warfare had actually achieved. That conception, however, was clearly rejected by the mature Clausewitz. Many analysts have assumed that the powerful description of ideal war in Book I must refer to the same concept, but in fact the two concepts are radically different and, in many respects, opposed. Clausewitz never seems to have resolved whether absolute war was supposed to reflect an achievable form or was instead an ideal to aim at, but just out of reach. Ideal war resolved that confusion by being blatantly unachievable in most of its aspects and reflecting an unrealistic idea of war that should not be pursued in real life.

See also

Carl von Clausewitz
On War
Total war
Perpetual war

References

Clausewitz, Carl von, On War, Book One, Chapter 1, and Book VIII, Chapters 2–6. The standard translation today (though not the most accurate version) is Carl von Clausewitz, On War, ed./trans. Michael Howard and Peter Paret (Princeton: Princeton University Press, 1976, revised 1984). Many unsophisticated writers reference the Penguin Classics version, dated 1968. This severe abridgement, a Vietnam War-era treatment (its hostility is aimed primarily at "neo-Clausewitzian" Henry Kissinger, not Clausewitz himself) is based on the archaic 1873 Graham translation. The most accurate translation, not currently the standard simply because the copyright-holder has failed to promote it, is Karl von Clausewitz, On War, trans. O.J. Matthijs Jolles (New York: Random House, 1943). All of the English translators, however, produced serious misrepresentations of Clausewitz's own thoughts, in part simply because of the differing historical character of the periods in which they worked.
Bassford, Christopher, "Clausewitz’s Categories of War and the Supersession of ‘Absolute War,’" ClausewitzStudies.org, 2016, http://www.clausewitzstudies.org/mobile/Bassford-Supersession5.pdf#zoom=100.

Military doctrines